Berkery is a surname. Notable people with the surname include:

Shane Berkery (born 1992), Irish-Japanese artist 
Tom Berkery (born 1953), Irish politician

See also
Berker
Berkey